Gabriel Rosado (born January 14, 1986) is an American professional boxer who challenged twice for a middleweight world title in 2013. Hailing from Philadelphia, Pennsylvania, Rosado is part of the city's large Puerto Rican community. Renowned for his toughness and willingness to face elite opposition, Rosado has competed in the light middleweight, middleweight and super middleweight divisions, winning a variety of regional championships along the way.

Amateur career
Rosado's amateur record was 8–3.

Professional career 
Rosado started his career in the light middleweight division. He won his first regional title on February 26, 2011, with a 12th round technical knockout over fellow contender Jamaal Davis to win the interim WBA-NABA light middleweight title. Later that year, he won the Pennsylvania state light middleweight title after a 10th round unanimous decision over contender Keenan Collins.  On June 1, 2012, Rosado faced Sechew Powell, stopping the future world title challenger in the 9th round to win the vacant WBO Inter-Continental light middleweight title. 

After amassing a record of 21–5 after 26 professional fights, he challenged undefeated WBA and IBO middleweight champion Gennady Golovkin on January 19, 2013, at The Theater at Madison Square Garden, New York City. Golovkin dominated the fight, inflicting Rosado with a nasty cut near his left eye in the second round. Rosado also bled from the nose as he was hammered by right hands and powerful jabs from his opponent. His trainer Billy Briscoe put a stop to the fight in the seventh round.

Two fights later, on October 26, 2013, Rosado challenged undefeated Peter Quillin for his WBO middleweight title. A nasty cut opened on the left eyelid of Rosado in the tenth round, causing a doctor stoppage and giving Quillin the technical knockout victory. Despite many observers believing the fight to have been competitive, the judges had scored the bout 87‐83, 89-81 and 90-80 in favor of Quillin at the time of the stoppage. Rosado yelled down at the Showtime commentary team that the doctor's stoppage was "bullshit" as soon as the fight was stopped, and told Jim Gray that he wanted a rematch; a rematch ultimately never materialized.

Since his two unsuccessful challenges for a world title in 2013, Rosado picked up notable wins against former IBF welterweight champion Joshua Clottey in 2015, and knocking out highly-rated undefeated prospect Bektemir Melikuziev in 2021, winning the WBA Continental Americas and WBO International super middleweight titles.

Temporary move to Big Knockout Boxing
Despite being shut out in his fight with Jermell Charlo on January 25, 2014, Rosado was offered the chance to face middleweight and super middleweight contender Brian Vera in a title match for the inaugural Big Knockout Boxing (BKB) middleweight championship. The bout took place on August 16, 2014. Rosado defeated Vera by sixth-round TKO and won the title.

Professional boxing record

Big Knockout Boxing record

In other media
Rosado appeared in the boxing film Creed (2015), starring Michael B. Jordan and Sylvester Stallone.

References

External links

American people of Puerto Rican descent
1986 births
Living people
Boxers from Pennsylvania
Puerto Rican male boxers
Middleweight boxers
American male boxers
Light-middleweight boxers